Chernyansky District is an administrative district (raion), one of the twenty-one in Belgorod Oblast, Russia. Municipally, it is incorporated as Chernyansky Municipal District. It is located in the northern central part of the oblast. Its administrative center is the urban locality (a settlement) of Chernyanka. Population:   33,899 (2002 Census);  The population of Chernyanka accounts for 50.1% of the district's total population.

References

Notes

Sources

Districts of Belgorod Oblast